Radoslav Novaković is a former Serbian rugby league player, playing at . He was the captain of the Serbia national rugby league team. After finishing the playing career, he remained within the sport as a referee and member of the Rugby league in Serbia managing board.

References

1978 births
Living people
Rugby league props
Serbian rugby league players
Serbia national rugby league team players
Sportspeople from Belgrade